Cross and circle is a board game design used for race games played throughout the world. The design of most cross and circle games involves a circle divided into four equal portions by a cross inscribed inside it; the classic example of this design is the Korean game Yut. However, the term "cross and circle" is typically widened to include boards that replace the circle with a square, and cruciform boards that collapse the circle onto the cross; all three types are topologically equivalent.

The Indian game Pachisi and its many descendants are perhaps the most well-known of all cross and circle games. Not all cross and circle games are descended from Pachisi; there are numerous examples of other similar games independently developed in other cultures.

List of games

See also 
 List of board games

References

External links 
 

 
Cross and circle games
Cross and circle games